Restaurants & Institutions (R&I) was a trade publication and web site owned by Reed Business Information serving the information needs of foodservice professionals at chains, independent restaurants, hotels and institutions.

The editor-in-chief was Patricia Dailey.
 
Established in 1937, R&I magazine was published semimonthly.

R&I's typical content included food trends, menu development ideas, new products and insights. In May, R&I hosted the Ivy awards, where they honored exemplary restaurants and foodservice operators.   Restaurants & Institutions also ranked the Top 400 restaurant chains each year, providing an industry score card and comparative overview.

As of June 2008, total BPA audited circulation was 130,000 subscribers.

The magazine's last issue was published in April 2010, when its publisher Reed Elsevier announced it would cease operation given the weak US economy and drop in ad sales.

References

External links
BPA Worldwide

Business magazines published in the United States
Biweekly magazines published in the United States
Defunct magazines published in the United States
Magazines established in 1937
Magazines disestablished in 2010
Magazines published in Illinois
Professional and trade magazines